Schiebler is a surname. Notable people with the surname include:

 Jeff Schiebler (born 1973), Canadian athlete
 Theodor Heinrich Schiebler (1923–2022), German anatomist

See also
 Schieber

German-language surnames